The River Mole a tributary of the River Taw in Devon which rises on the southwestern border of Exmoor. The river takes its name from the market towns of North and South Molton. The river used to be known as the Nymet.

Tributaries
River Yeo
Crooked Oak
River Bray
Little Silver Stream

See also
 List of rivers of England

References

External links

Mole, River
1Mole